Hồ ly tinh also known as Hồ tiên (狐仙), Hồ ly (狐狸), Hồ tinh (狐精), Hồ yêu (狐妖), Yêu hồ (妖狐) or Cáo tinh (Chữ Nôm: 𤞺精). Vietnamese nine-tailed fox do not have a specific personality, some stories tell about them harming people but along with them are stories about them helping people.

According to a quite famous version, hồ ly tinh are fox that has the ability to cultivate to be able to transform and have magic, if they practice for a hundred years, then they will have three tails and are called Yêu hồ or Tam vĩ yêu hồ (Three-tails demon fox), cultivate until after 1000 years, it changed to Lục vĩ ma hồ (Six-tailed ghost fox). And so on when he reached the realm of 9-tails, Cửu vĩ hồ or Cửu vĩ thiên hồ (Nine-tailed celestial fox) they can turn into humans each tail is a life of them. To kill a fox, you must cut off its tail first.

Some famous legends
In the book Lĩnh Nam chích quái, the Hồ ly tinh (or Hồ tinh) is also mentioned with the image of an animal that causes harm to good people, then killed by Lạc Long Quân to eliminate harm to the people. West Lake is the tomb where the nine-tailed fox is buried. The story goes that:

{{cquote|Thăng Long citadel, formerly known as Long Biên, was uninhabited in ancient times. Lý Thái Tổ rowed a boat at Nhĩ Hà river wharf, two dragons led the boat, so it was named Thăng Long, and then built the capital there. In the past, in the west of the citadel, there was a small rocky mountain, the east pillow up on the Lỗ Giang river. In the cave, at the foot of the mountain, there is a nine-tailed white fox that has lived for more than a thousand years and can transform into a demon, a human, or a demon that travels around the world.The nine-tailed fox turned into a man in a white shirt and entered the Man's crowd, singing together and luring boys and girls into hiding in a mountain cave. The nine-tailed fox sometimes turns into a beautiful girl, enticing boys, sometimes turns into a handsome young man to flirt with village girl; sometimes it's the devil that scares people... It did so because it wanted to capture as many people as possible and bring it back to the deep cave to eat gradually. Long Quân then ordered the Lục bộ thủy phủ (senior authorities under the water palace) to raise water to attack the cave. The nine-tailed fox ran away, the navy chased after him, broke the den to catch the fox, and devoured it.

This place became a deep pool called Xác Cáo lagoon (Fox Corpses lagoon), which is Tây Hồ today. After establishing the temple, ie Kim Ngưu Tự to suppress the demon. The field in the West Lake is very flat, local people cultivate and do business, now called Hồ Động (Fox cave). The land here is high and dry, people build houses to live in, now called Hồ Thôn (Fox village). The old fox cave, now called Lỗ Khước Thôn.|||Lĩnh Nam chích quái}}
In Đại Việt sử ký toàn thư, it is recorded that Emperor Lê Thái Tổ was once saved by a hồ ly tinh. It was when he was hiding from the Ming army in Lam Sơn, he was being pursued closely, suddenly at that time he saw a girl in a white dress floating in the river, he buried the girl well and hid again. Until the Ming army almost found out, there was a white fox running out of nowhere, causing the Ming army to change direction. Lê Thái Tổ thought that it was the girl who saved him, later he named her the guardian god of the country and made a statue of a girl with half a body of a nine-tailed fox, called Hồ ly phu nhân  (狐狸夫人) or Hộ quốc phu nhân (護國夫人).

At the end of the 18th century, the poet Phạm Đình Hổ described the statue of Hộ Quốc phu nhân in his work Vũ Trung tùy bút as follows: " ...That statue has a human head and the body of a hồ ly, very beautiful figure, the shape of a young girl, her hair in a bun and brooch."Worship

In some regions in central and southern Vietnam, there are two worshipers of Hồ Ly Cửu Vĩ tiên nương (狐狸九尾仙娘) and Phấn Nhĩ Quỷ Vương tiên nương (奮茸鬼王仙娘).  
According to stories of local people in Đà Nẵng, Khánh Hòa: "Hồ Ly Cửu Vĩ tiên nương (Nine-tailed fox cultivates to become a fairy) and Phấn Nhĩ Quỷ Vương tiên nương (Bird ruffled feathers, cultivated to become a king, guarded the demon realm) are two sisters you and are the patron gods of the villagers. In the past, Xuân Thiều village was a desolate land full of miasma, dense forests, and many wild animals. The first people who came to reclaim this land encountered many dangers, every day had to fight wild animals, raging diseases that made many people sick and dead. The villagers prayed to the gods to help them overcome the difficulties that surrounded them. One night the villagers saw a nine-tailed fox emerge from the cave and a feathered bird flew back from the mountain and transformed into two beautiful women.  The two women eliminated wild animals and cured the people of the village. After that no one saw the two women again, since then the village has been peaceful. The villagers believed that the heavenly maiden came down to help, so they set up a temple to villagers.''"

See also

Huli jing, a similar fox spirit from China
Kitsune, a similar fox spirit from Japan
Kumiho, a similar fox spirit from Korea
Lĩnh Nam chích quái
Việt điện u linh tập

References

Vietnamese legendary creatures
Mythological foxes